The She Beast is a 1966 horror film written and directed by Michael Reeves in his directorial debut. The film stars Barbara Steele, John Karlsen and Ian Ogilvy.

Plot

The film starts in Transylvania with an alcoholic, Count Von Helsing, reading from a text, which begins a historical narrative of the witch, Bardella.

The film flashes back roughly 200 years to a religious service during his reading, where a child shows up and reports Bardella's location. Then, hysteria breaks out because of the pastor's leadership, and the congregation sets out to find and kill the witch. However, one of the villagers warns the others against killing the witch, as he explains the Count must exorcise the witch first, lest she will not die and will linger on as a curse for generations to come.

Nevertheless, the congregation sets out and finds the witch. Upon finding her, the pastor directs the crowd to take her to the lake, where she will be impaled and dunked. As Bardella is tied into the chair, she curses the people and their descendants for what they are doing and threatens she will return. The Count and his attendant secretly watch the execution from a distance upon a hilltop and seemingly purposely do not intervene. Then the story returns to the reflective Von Helsing in his cave.

Next, a young, newly married couple is traveling in a midnight-blue Volkswagen Beetle through the Carpathian Mountains in Transylvania for their honeymoon. The husband, Philip, realizes he is lost and stops to look at a map with his wife, Veronica. A lawman passes by, and Philip asks for directions and recommendations for overnight lodging.

When they arrive in Vaubrac, they find the town run down and unimpressive. Before they are to drive on, the hotel owner, Ladislav Groper, happens upon them and offers them a room, bread, and tea- attempting to accommodate their English traditions. While waiting for their food and tea, they notice Von Helsing strangely swinging on a nearby swing set. After they toss aside the garlic that came with their food and tea, Von Helsing immediately explains why the garlic was in their tea- as protection against Satanism and witchcraft.  He then goes on a verbal diatribe explaining he is an aristocrat (albeit dispossessed of his castle by the current governmental regime) and relates the history of the Von Helsing family and the Draculas. In the process, he cons them into buying him a bottle to drink, and, wearing on, Von Helsing recounts the story and curse of Bardella. However, the couple is skeptical.

Quickly tiring of the Count's recitation, the couple retires to their room for the evening. During their conversation, Groper rudely intrudes upon the couple's room without knocking, claiming there is no privacy in the People's Republic. Offended, Philip requests a different room but is denied. Nevertheless, once Groper leaves, the couple becomes romantic together. However, they are interrupted again by Groper watching their lovemaking through the window. Philip scrambles to beat up Groper. Returning to his wife, he wants to leave Vaubrac; but Veronica decides she wants to stay and reassures him that Groper will not bother them again.

They attempt to leave early the next morning, but Philip finds Groper stole the distributor cap from their car, which he promptly retrieves. Driving down the road, Philip loses steering control of the Volkswagen and narrowly misses hitting a delivery truck head-on, causing him to crash into a lake. Veronica's body is then possessed by the spirit of the 18th-century witch killed by the local villagers and is now bent on avenging herself upon them. Both persons are still unconscious. The truck driver, who has a bad local reputation with the police, retrieves Philip and what he thought was his wife but was Bardella instead. He brings them back to Vaubrac, leaving them with Groper, so the police would not accuse him of any wrongdoing.

Meanwhile, Philip comes to and inquires Groper about his wife. When Philip realizes that Veronica is missing and something/someone else is in her place, he becomes enraged again at Groper, who denies knowing anything about who the other body is. Suddenly Von Helsing arrives and notices that the woman mistaken as Veronica is indeed Bardella, having returned. Then he reassures Philip that he can help him get his wife back.

Von Helsing asks Philip a series of questions regarding the accident and then takes him back to his cave. He begins reading from a record book entitled "The Death of Bardella the Witch." Philip then grows frustrated and impatient with what he regards as unrelated to his missing wife and finally leaves on foot in order to report the incident to the police. Von Helsing then pursues him in his yellow roadster, an early model Citroën.

However, Von Helsing does not find Philip but arrives back in town, where he visits Bardella to bring her back to life. Meanwhile, Groper is heavily drinking, watching porn, and gorging his face with food. The witch comes back to life, momentarily attacking and strangling Von Helsing, then leaves. Groper's niece shows up horrified, seeking protection from the scary noises she had heard due to Bardella's screeching. However, Groper invites her in and attempts to rape her, but breaking free of him, she escapes.

Groper goes after her, but once outside, Philip confronts him, whom he clobbers with his bottle of alcohol, leaving him unconscious on the road. The truck driver happens by again but swerves to miss him. Later, Von Helsing comes upon him and drags him out of the road. Meanwhile, Groper is heavily drinking again when suddenly Bardella attacks and kills him with a hammer and sickle.

Von Helsing and Philip take off to find Bardella. Again, Philip wants to go to the police, but Von Helsing explains Bardella has returned. If she were to be gunned down by police, he would not be able to perform the exorcism necessary on the witch to bring Veronica back. Slowly, Philip begins believing in Von Helsing and what he says.

Back in town, there is an illegal cockfight going on. Bardella has gone on a killing spree against the descendants of the people who killed her 200 years before. On foot through town, Von Helsing and Philip begin searching for Bardella. Bardella shows up at the cockfight to get revenge on the villagers there. Von Helsing comes upon the scene and uses a syringe to drug the witch. They load her in his roadster and take her back to the hotel's kitchen to put her on ice for safekeeping. Then they go to Von Helsing's cave to pick up some ritual tools to exorcise Bardella.

After being jailed, the truck driver makes a deal to tell police where Bardella is in exchange for his freedom. He leads the police back to the hotel, where they find the drugged witch. The comrade police lieutenant intends to have Bardella autopsied and buried, which would ruin any chances of bringing Veronica back. Reneging, the police lieutenant takes the truck driver back into custody. Returning to the hotel from Von Helsing's cave, Philip and the Count find Bardella missing. So they head to the police station and steal back Bardella's body from under them.

A car chase ensues, with Von Helsing and Philip in the police van and the police driving Von Helsing's roadster. The roadster momentarily stalls, enabling Von Helsing and Philip to evade them. However, Von Helsing realizes the ritual tools he needs to bring Veronica back are in his car, so they pull over, and the police catch up with them. While lying in the police van, Bardella awakens from her drugged state. She then attacks the approaching police officers. Von Helsing uses his syringe to drug Bardella again and the police officers.

They carry Bardella to the roadster and transport her to the lake, where they find the dunking chair. They strap her into the chair, perform a ritual and drop her into the water, where she disappears. Philip panics. But suddenly, Veronica floats to the surface, and her husband retrieves her.

Finally, the three drive off in Von Helsing's Citroën, out of Transylvania to Czechoslovakia. Due to Von Helsing's havoc in Vaubrac, he decides to leave the country for England with his two new friends. Light-heartedly, Philip jokes about the inhospitality of Vaubrac and is relieved by leaving. But on the other hand, Veronica seemingly has good feelings about Vaubrac and Transylvania altogether, claiming in the end, "I'll be back," echoing what Vardella had threatened before she was tortured and killed 200 years earlier.

Cast
Barbara Steele as Veronica
John Karlsen as Count Von Helsing
Ian Ogilvy as Philip
Mel Welles as Ladislav Groper
Joe "Flash" Riley as the She Beast/witch (Vardella)
Ennio Antonelli as the truck driver
Lucretia Love as Groper's niece

Production
The entire film was shot in 21 days. Many members of the crew appeared in the film as minor roles. Barbara Steele accepted a salary of $1,000 for working one single day. She was forced to work that day for 18 hours.  Michael Byron is credited on screen with the script. Byron is an alias for Reeves.  Chuck B. Griffith, Reeves' biographer, states that film also had contributions from F. Amos Powell and Mel Welles.

Sources conflict in crediting the production country of the film.

Release
The film was purchased for release by Miracle Films as Revenge of the Blood Beast and released in Kilburn, London in late 1966. It was released in Rome, Italy in July 1967 where it was distributed by Cineriz. The film was also released in 1966 in the United States by American International Pictures as The She-Beast. The film played as early as 2 May 1966 in Atlanta in the United States.

Reception
A contemporary review in the Monthly Film Bulletin referred to the film as "An engaging horror film [...] the beginning is a trifle comatose with its self-consciously stylish slow tracks and compositions [...] it gradually gathers momentum while developing a nice line in comic grotesquerie with its furtively lecherous innkeeper" The review commented on Barbara Steele in the film noting that she "gets little chance to display the grand manner in her comparatively brief role, but the acting in general is sound (enormously helped by the fact that the leading players would appear to have dubbed their own dialogue)."

In June 2010, Nick Coccellato of Eccentric Cinema gave the film a rating of five out of ten, writing "The She-Beast, A.K.A. Revenge of the Blood Beast, is one of those movies that wouldn't be out of place on Mystery Science Theater 3000 back in the show's '90s heyday. The film is bad but not uninteresting, and there is a lot of the fun to be had in simply watching it unfurl with its lousy acting and overwrought direction […]"

Home media
On 28 April 2009, Dark Sky Films released a DVD version of the film in an anamorphic 2.35:1 transfer with a Dolby 2.0 mono soundtrack. Special features include an image gallery and an audio commentary by producer Paul Maslansky and actors Ian Ogilvy and Barbara Steele.

References

Sources

External links
 
 

1966 films
1966 directorial debut films
1966 horror films
1960s supernatural horror films
Films directed by Michael Reeves
Films with screenplays by Charles B. Griffith
Films produced by Paul Maslansky
Films set in Transylvania
Films about nobility
Films about witchcraft
Films with screenplays by Michael Reeves
Cockfighting in film
1960s English-language films